North Pacific Airlines (NPA) was a commuter air carrier formed in 1987 which operated scheduled passenger service on behalf United Airlines via a code sharing agreement as a United Express carrier initially from the Seattle–Tacoma International Airport (SEA) to three destinations in Washington state and also to Portland, Oregon.

By 1989, the airline had expanded its route network and was serving fifteen destinations located in Idaho, Montana, Oregon and Washington state (see destination list below).

In 1991, the airline, which was owned by WestAir Holding, Inc., was merged with WestAir Commuter Airlines which operated flights in California and other states as a United Express carrier. WestAir Commuter Airlines was also owned by the WestAir Holding corporation.

Another commuter air carrier which used the North Pacific Airlines name operated in Alaska as NPA from the early to mid 1980s.

Destinations in 1989 

According to the Official Airline Guide (OAG), North Pacific Airlines was operating United Express service with British Aerospace BAe Jetstream 31 and Embraer EMB-120 Brasilia propjets to the following destinations in late 1989:

 Bellingham, WA
 Boise, ID
 Eugene, OR
 Kalispell, MT
 Lewiston, ID
 Medford, OR
 Missoula, MT
 Pasco, WA
 Portland, OR (PDX) - Hub
 Pullman, WA
 Redmond, OR
 Seattle/Tacoma, WA (SEA) - Hub
 Spokane, WA
 Wenatchee, WA
 Yakima, WA

Fleet

See also 
 List of defunct airlines of the United States

References

External links 

 
Airlines established in 1987
Airlines disestablished in 1991
Defunct regional airlines of the United States 
American companies established in 1987
1987 establishments in Washington (state)
1991 disestablishments in Washington (state)